Mohammed Alazzawie, ("Moe") (born 29 November 1984) is a Swedish singer.

Moe charted hits with the songs "Backstabber", "Side by Side" and "Stop", from his album My World  released in 2002. He was one of Sweden's first social media launched singer, launching his career on Lunarstorm.

Discography

Singles

References

Living people
1984 births
Swedish pop singers